Liptena hapale is a butterfly in the family Lycaenidae. It is found in Uganda and north-western Tanzania.

References

Butterflies described in 1935
Liptena